Taxtakópir district (Karakalpak: Тахтакөпир районы, Taxtakópir rayonı) is a district of Karakalpakstan in Uzbekistan. The capital lies at Taxtakópir.

There is one town Taxtakópir and eight rural communities Beltau, Jańadárya, Múlk, Atakól, Qara ay, Qaratereń, Qońiratkól, Taxtakópir.

References

Karakalpakstan
Districts of Uzbekistan